| top point scorer =  Jondre Williams (99 points)
| top try scorer   =  De-An Ackermann (11 tries)
| prevseason       = 2019–20
| nextseason       = 2022 Liga Nationala season  
| website          =  https://rugbyromania.ro
}}

The 2021 SuperLiga (also known as the CEC Bank SuperLiga for sponsorship reasons) is the 107th season of premier club rugby in Romania, and the 10th season of the competition under the name of the CEC Bank SuperLiga. Starting with this edition, Gloria Buzău will no longer participate in the SuperLiga due to the dissolvation of the club last year.

Teams

Note: Flags indicate national union as has been defined under WR eligibility rules. Players may hold more than one non-WR nationality

Table
This is the regular season league table:

Fixtures & Results

Round 1

Round 2

Round 3

Round 4

Round 5

Round 6

Round 7

Round 8

Round 1 (rescheduled match)

Round 8 (rescheduled match)

Round 9

Round 10

Play-off semifinals

Semifinals

5th Place final

3rd Place final

1st Place final

Leading scorers
Note: Flags to the left of player names indicate national team as has been defined under World Rugby eligibility rules, or primary nationality for players who have not yet earned international senior caps. Players may hold one or more non-WR nationalities.

Most points

Most tries

External links
 rugbyromania.ro – Official Website

References

SuperLiga (rugby)
2020–21 in Romanian rugby union
2020–21 in European rugby union leagues